Maurice Faivre (19 March 1926 – 4 November 2020) was a French Général and political scientist.

He fought for France in the Algerian War, on which he published numerous works.

Education
École spéciale militaire de Saint-Cyr (1947–1949)
Cavalry School (1949–1950, 1958)
Collège interarmées de défense (1964–1966)
Master of Advanced Studies from Politique de Défense, Strasbourg (1981)
Doctorate of Political Science from Sorbonne University (1986)

Bibliography
Les nations armées (1988)
Un village de harkis (1994)
Les combattants musulmans de la guerre d'Algérie (1995)
L'Algérie, l'Otan, la bombe (1998)
Les archives inédites de la politique algérienne (2000)
Conflits d'autorité durant la guerre d'Algérie (2004)
Le Renseignement dans la guerre d'Algérie (2006)

Distinctions
Cross for Military Valour (1957)
Ordre national du Mérite
Commander of the Legion of Honour (2016)
Member of the Académie des sciences d'outre-mer (2002)

References

1926 births
2020 deaths
French political scientists
French generals
French military personnel of the Algerian War
Recipients of the Ordre national du Mérite
Commandeurs of the Légion d'honneur
People from Doubs